The LA Music Awards is a fee-based awards program originally held in the city of Los Angeles, California to celebrate new artists around the world.  In 2015 the Awards held their 25th anniversary with a program in located at the Avalon Theater in Los Angeles.  The international online competition allows fans to vote their favorite musical artist to the top of his/ her category.

The program, which also includes the F.A.M.E. Awards (film, art, music, and entertainment) has since been relocated to the city of Las Vegas, Nevada.  The show's producer, Al Bowman, is also the shows's founder.

 the competition proceeded thus: artists in the categories of Pop, Rock, and Country entered their application online by creating an artist page and paid an application fee.  Fans then voted for their favorites via the website, eventually selecting the top10 for each of category. Those 30 artists or groups were flown to Los Angeles where they then performed and competed in front of a panel of judges. The top winner in each category then received a recording contract through Rock Star University Records and was flown back to the West Coast to record a 10-track studio album. Funding for the award is largely provided by those participating in it, with various retainer and marketing fees in 2014 adding up to over $20,000 per participant for those who go on to the final round.  Additional funding comes from tickets which must be purchased by contestants and then sold by them to would-be audience members for, in 2014, $175 a piece.

However, the LA Music Awards website, does not show anything past 2014. Also the acclaimed winners of the 2016 award are not shown at the Avalon Theater but at the Hard Rock Cafe on Hollywood Boulevard.

In 1992 the Los Angeles Times said of the show that it "has a lack of feeling for the city's musical character and diversity".  The show also chooses to highlight many artists who are well known but who never submitted applications and do not attend the show itself.

References

American music awards